Gerald Anthony Robinson Jr. (born February 10, 1989) is an American professional basketball player for Dinamo Sassari of the Italian Lega Basket Serie A (LBA). Standing at 1.85 m (6'1"), he plays at the point guard and shooting guard positions.

College career
Robinson played college basketball at Tennessee State University, with the Tennessee State Tigers. He played at Tennessee State from 2007 to 2009. Robinson then attended the University of Georgia. He played with the school's men's team, the Georgia Bulldogs, from 2010 to 2012.

Professional career
Robinson started his pro career in Belgium with the Leuven Bears.

In July 2013, Robinson joined the Memphis Grizzlies for the 2013 NBA Summer League in Las Vegas. In August 2013, he signed a one-year deal with Gilboa Galil of Israel.

On August 25, 2014, he signed with Latvian powerhouse VEF Rīga.

On July 1, 2015, he signed with French club JSF Nanterre.

On March 30, 2017, Robinson moved to ALBA Berlin of the German Basketball Bundesliga.

On July 6, 2017, Robinson signed with AS Monaco.

On October 24, 2019,  Robinson signed with Promitheas Patras.

On January 24, 2020, he has signed with Frutti Extra Bursaspor of the Turkish Super League (BSL).

On August 11, 2020, he has signed with Virtus Roma of the Italian Serie A (LBA).

After Virtus Roma's withdrawal from the Serie A due to financial problems, Robinson, like all the Roma players, was made free agent. On 29 December V.L. Pesaro signed Robinson for a period of seven weeks until February 15 to replace the injured Frantz Massenat.

After the experience in V.L. Pesaro and after playing the Italian Cup final, Robinson moved to JDA Dijon Basket in France, where he signed until the end of the season.

On September 3, 2021, he has signed with Niners Chemnitz of the Basketball Bundesliga. At mid-season, on November 28, Robinson moved to Dinamo Sassari in the Italian Serie A and Basketball Champions League.

References

External links 
VEF Rīga Profile 
Gerald Robinson Bio
Profile at Eurobasket.com

1989 births
Living people
20th-century African-American people
21st-century African-American sportspeople
African-American basketball players
Alba Berlin players
American expatriate basketball people in Belgium
American expatriate basketball people in France
American expatriate basketball people in Germany
American expatriate basketball people in Iran
American expatriate basketball people in Israel
American expatriate basketball people in Latvia
American expatriate basketball people in Monaco
American men's basketball players
AS Monaco Basket players
BK VEF Rīga players
Bursaspor Basketbol players
Dinamo Sassari players
Georgia Bulldogs basketball players
Hapoel Gilboa Galil Elyon players
Leuven Bears players
Nanterre 92 players
NINERS Chemnitz players
Petrochimi Bandar Imam BC players
Point guards
Promitheas Patras B.C. players
Basketball players from Nashville, Tennessee
Tennessee State Tigers basketball players